Olivier Coqueux (born November 29, 1973) is a French former professional ice hockey player.

Coqueux competed in the 2004 and 2008 IIHF World Championship as a member of the France men's national ice hockey team.

Awards and honours

References

External links

1973 births
Living people
Boxers de Bordeaux players
Diables Rouges de Briançon players
Dragons de Rouen players
Edinburgh Capitals players
EHC Freiburg players
French ice hockey forwards
EfB Ishockey players
Olofströms IK players
People from Saumur
Scorpions de Mulhouse players
Sportspeople from Maine-et-Loire
Tucson Gila Monsters players
French expatriate sportspeople in the United States
French expatriate ice hockey people
French expatriate sportspeople in Denmark
French expatriate sportspeople in Scotland
French expatriate sportspeople in Sweden
Expatriate ice hockey players in Sweden
Expatriate ice hockey players in Denmark
Expatriate ice hockey players in the United States
Expatriate ice hockey players in Scotland
French expatriate sportspeople in Germany
Expatriate ice hockey players in Germany